KJCR-LP (107.9 FM) is a radio station licensed to Grants Pass, Oregon, United States. The station is owned by His Mercy Radio, Inc.

It has been granted a U.S. Federal Communications Commission (FCC) construction permit to increase to 100 watts ERP and decrease HAAT to -134 meters.

References

External links
 
FCC construction permit

JCR-LP
Grants Pass, Oregon
JCR-LP